, is a song by Japanese rock band Kana-Boon. It was released as the band's twelfth major-label single, released on July 12, 2017 through Ki/oon Music. "Baton Road" was used as the first opening theme song for the anime series Boruto: Naruto Next Generations.

Background
On March 13, 2017, the 15th issue of the 2017 release of Weekly Shōnen Jump revealed that Kana-Boon would be performing the first opening theme for Boruto: Naruto Next Generations. Kana-Boon previously performed three theme songs for the Naruto franchise: "Silhouette" for Naruto Shippuden, "Diver" for Boruto: Naruto the Movie, and "Spiral" for Naruto Shippuden: Ultimate Ninja Storm 4.

On writing the song, Kana-Boon's singer and guitarist Maguro Taniguchi stated that the title was decided due to Boruto: Naruto Next Generations being the next generation for the Naruto franchise, with a baton being handed over from Naruto to Boruto.

Release and reception
The single was released on July 12, 2017 with two releases, a standard edition, and a limited edition release. The limited edition contains a bonus DVD with a documentary about drummer Takahiro Koizumi and his experience with his first directorial work, "Shin Silhouette", a new music video for Silhouette, and the "Shin Silhouette" music video.

The song was later included in the Boruto: Naruto Next Generations compilation album Boruto The Best, released on December 18, 2019 by Aniplex.

The single reached number 18 on the Oricon charts.

Music video
The music video for "Baton Road" was released on July 1, 2017. The video shows Kana-Boon performing on a road within a wheat field. The video also shows a young schoolboy being given a red baton, who then runs to his friends, and then passes on the baton to an older student. The older student receives the baton, and runs towards his love interest. The student then passes the baton onto an office lady. The office lady, after putting away her CV, receives the baton and starts running towards her job interview. The office lady then passes the baton onto a salaryman. The salaryman then runs towards a construction worker and performs a dogeza. At the end of the song, Maguro Taniguchi then receives the baton.

Track listing

Charts

Release history

References

2017 singles
2017 songs
Kana-Boon songs
Ki/oon Music singles
Naruto songs